Maccaffertium mexicanum is a species of flatheaded mayfly in the family Heptageniidae. It is found in Central America and North America. In North America its range includes southern Mexico.

Subspecies
These two subspecies belong to the species Maccaffertium mexicanum:
 Maccaffertium mexicanum integrum (McDunnough, 1924)
 Maccaffertium mexicanum mexicanum (Ulmer, 1920)

References

Further reading

External links

 

Mayflies
Articles created by Qbugbot
Insects described in 1920